Lesego Keleboge is a Notswana footballer who plays as a midfielder for  the Botswana women's national team.

References

Living people
Botswana women's footballers
Women's association football midfielders
Botswana women's international footballers
Year of birth missing (living people)